Lodge Corner (also Lodge or Lodges Corner prior to 1950) is an unincorporated community in Arkansas County, Arkansas, United States. The community is located where Arkansas Highway 276 begins at U.S. Route 165.

Education
Residents are in the Stuttgart School District. It operates Stuttgart High School.

References

Unincorporated communities in Arkansas County, Arkansas
Unincorporated communities in Arkansas